Mun Im-cheol (born 16 June 1972) is a South Korean boxer. He competed in the men's middleweight event at the 1996 Summer Olympics.

References

1972 births
Living people
South Korean male boxers
Olympic boxers of South Korea
Boxers at the 1996 Summer Olympics
Place of birth missing (living people)
Middleweight boxers